Guide was a convict ship that transported six convicts from Calcutta, India to Fremantle, Western Australia in 1855. It arrived in Fremantle on 9 January 1855.  The six convicts were all soldiers who had been convicted by court-martial and sentenced to transportation.  In addition to the convicts, there were 16 passengers on board.

List of convicts on the Guide

See also
List of convict ship voyages to Western Australia
Convict era of Western Australia

References

Convict ships to Western Australia